"Come with Me" is a song by singer Sammie released as the second single from his second album, Sammie.

The video premiered on 106 & Park and was inspired by Michael Jackson's music video for "Stranger in Moscow."

Charts

Weekly charts

Year-end charts

References

2007 singles
Sammie songs
Songs written by Bryan-Michael Cox
Songs written by Adonis Shropshire
2006 songs
Rowdy Records singles
Cash Money Records singles
Song recordings produced by Bryan-Michael Cox